Ionel Fernic (born May 29, 1901, in Târgovişte – d. July 22, 1938, in Stulpicani) was a Romanian composer, aviator (civil pilot), writer, and one of the first Romanian parachutists.

Early life
His family moved to Galaţi, where Ionel attended the "Vasile Alecsandri" High School, and where he met his mentor, the Romanian composer and music teacher Teodor Fuchs, who tutored him in the arts of piano and guitar music. Being a music enthusiast, and passionate about airplanes, Ionel Fernic was guided by his parents to attend a technical faculty but he eventually decided to go to the National University of Music Bucharest, where he was admitted at the drama section with the highest grade average.

Although he was remarked by his teachers, Ionel did not continue his acting career despite having the opportunity to play alongside many famous Romanian actors like Aristide Demetriade, Ion Manolescu or Mişu Fotino. He graduated in 1924, and was enrolled in the Reserve Officer School in Ploieşti and remained in the city for a few years, the period when he wrote almost all of his works.

Under the guidance of professor Fuchs, Fernic composed in 1919, his last high school year, the ballad Cruce albă de mesteacăn, his first well known work. After settling in Ploieşti, having an urge to create successful music, he composes a number of sentimental songs and tangos. His first tango, composed in 1931, was called Minciuna (better known by the name Pe boltă când apare luna), and was an adaptation of a French song proposed by Nicolae Kiriţescu.

Successful composer
In just a few years, Fernic wrote over 400 sentimental and other kinds of songs. Many of his songs were hits. Starting in 1927, Fernic published a volume of sketch stories called Misterele din Mizil (written as a feuilleton). In 1928, he published a volume of poems called Prăştii and several children's books. He founded the satirical magazine Să nu te superi că te-njur, and moved to Bucharest in the early 1930s.

Flying career
Ionel Fernic graduated from the Pilot School in Băneasa in the spring of 1935, and received a pilot's licence. Fernic also made the first parachute jump in Romania on May 31, 1936, at an aviation meeting held at the Băneasa Airport in Bucharest. He was appointed director of the Cernăuţi Pilot School, and was decorated by King Carol II with the Virtutea Aeronautică medal.

Death
Ionel Fernic lost his life in an aviation accident on July 22, 1938, at the age of 37. Hearing of the death of queen Marie of Romania in 1938, he desperately wanted to attend her funeral. Therefore, he embarked on a LOT Polish Airlines flight on the Warsaw-Cernauti-Bucharest–Thessaloniki route, but after half an hour the plane mysteriously broke into two pieces and crashed between Gura Humorului and Câmpulung Moldovenesc, in the Negrileasa forest, near the Stulpicani commune in Suceava County.

Musical plays

References

Romanian composers
Romanian male poets
People from Târgoviște
1901 births
1938 deaths
Victims of aviation accidents or incidents in Romania
20th-century Romanian poets
20th-century composers
20th-century Romanian male writers